Alla fiera dell'est is an album by the Italian singer-songwriter Angelo Branduardi. It was released in 1976 by Polydor and won the prize of Italian music critics in the same year. In 1978 it was released in a French version with the title "A la foire de l'est" and in an English version, entitled "Highdown Fair", with lyrics by Peter Sinfield.

Lyrics of the Italian version were written by Branduardi's wife, Luisa Zappa. The title track is an adaptation of a Hebrew Passover song "Chad Gadya". "Il vecchio e la farfalla" is inspired by an oriental proverb mentioned in The Travels of Marco Polo. "La serie dei numeri" ("The Song of Eternal Numbers") is taken from a Breton song, "Ar rannoù" ("The series"), contained in the anthology Barzaz Breiz. The melody of "Sotto il tiglio" ("Under the Linden Tree") is based on a German lied entitled "Unter den Linden", written by Walther von der Vogelweide.

Track listing
"Alla fiera dell'est" - 5:26
"La favola degli aironi" - 3:47
"Il vecchio e la farfalla" - 2:59
"Canzone per Sarah" - 4:21
"La serie dei numeri" - 4:33
"Il dono del cervo" - 3:17
"Il funerale" - 8:10
"L'uomo e la nuvola" - 3:49
"Sotto il tiglio - 2:56
"Canzone del rimpianto" - 3:01

1976 albums
Angelo Branduardi albums
Polydor Records albums